Alcohols, in various forms, are used within medicine as an antiseptic, disinfectant, and antidote. Alcohols applied to the skin are used to disinfect skin before a needle stick and before surgery. They may be used both to disinfect the skin of the person and as hand sanitizer of the healthcare providers. They can also be used to clean other areas and in mouthwashes. Taken by mouth or injected into a vein, ethanol is used to treat methanol or ethylene glycol toxicity when fomepizole is not available.

Side effects of alcohols applied to the skin include skin irritation. Care should be taken with electrocautery, as ethanol is flammable. Types of alcohol used include ethanol, denatured ethanol, 1-propanol, and isopropyl alcohol. Alcohols are effective against a range of microorganisms, though they do not inactivate spores. Concentrations of 60 to 90% work best.

Alcohol has been used as an antiseptic as early as 1363, with evidence to support its use becoming available in the late 1800s. It is on the World Health Organization's List of Essential Medicines.  Commercial formulations of hand sanitizer or with other agents such as chlorhexidine are available.

Medical uses
Applied to the skin, alcohols are used to disinfect skin before a needle stick and before surgery. They may be used both to disinfect the skin of the person and the hands of the healthcare providers. They can also be used to clean other areas, and in mouthwashes. 95% ABV ethanol is known as spiritus fortis in medical context.

Taken by mouth or injected into a vein ethanol is used to treat methanol or ethylene glycol toxicity when fomepizole is not available.

Additionally, absolute ethanol is used as a sclerosant in sclerotherapy. Sclerotherapy has been used "in the treatment of simple pleural effusions, vascular malformations, lymphocytes and seromas."

Mechanism
Ethanol, when used for toxicity, competes with other alcohols for the alcohol dehydrogenase enzyme, lessening metabolism into toxic aldehyde and carboxylic acid derivatives, and reducing more serious toxic effect of the glycols to crystallize in the kidneys.

History
Alcohol has been used as an antiseptic as early as 1363 with evidence to support its use becoming available in the late 1800s. Since antiquity, prior to the development of modern agents, alcohol was used as a general anesthetic.

References

Alcohol dehydrogenase inhibitors
Alcohols
Antidotes
Antiseptics
Disinfectants
Hepatotoxins
World Health Organization essential medicines
Wikipedia medicine articles ready to translate